The Freehold Borough Schools are a community public school district that serves students in pre-kindergarten through eighth grade from Freehold Borough in Monmouth County, New Jersey, United States.

As of the 2018–19 school year, the district, comprising three schools, had an enrollment of 1,698 students and 140.0 classroom teachers (on an FTE basis), for a student–teacher ratio of 12.1:1.

The district is classified by the New Jersey Department of Education as being in District Factor Group "B", the second lowest of eight groupings. District Factor Groups organize districts statewide to allow comparison by common socioeconomic characteristics of the local districts. From lowest socioeconomic status to highest, the categories are A, B, CD, DE, FG, GH, I and J.

Students in public school for ninth through twelfth grades attend Freehold High School, as part of the Freehold Regional High School District or may apply to attend the district's specialized programs housed in other high schools in the FRHSD. As of the 2018–19 school year, Freehold Borough High School had an enrollment of 1,422 students and 103.8 classroom teachers (on an FTE basis), for a student–teacher ratio of 13.7:1. The Freehold Regional High School District also serves students from Colts Neck Township, Englishtown, Farmingdale, Freehold Township (which also has some students at Freehold Borough High School), Howell Township, Manalapan Township and Marlboro Township.

Freehold Borough was awarded a research grant in 2004 by the National Institute of Justice, a research branch of the United States Department of Justice. The $360,000 grant was entitled "Teacher-Parent Authentication Security System II: The Next Generation of Iris Recognition Technology in Schools" and was awarded to the Freehold Borough Board of Education.

Schools
Schools in the district (with 2018–19 school enrollment data from the National Center for Education Statistics) are:
Freehold Learning Center with 619 students in grades PreK-2
William Smith, Principal
Park Avenue Elementary School with 532 students in grades 3-5
Patrick Mulhern, Principal
Freehold Intermediate School with 515 students in grades 6-8
Ronnie Dougherty, Principal

In the era of de jure educational segregation in the United States Freehold, New Jersey had a separate elementary school for black children; the school was still segregated in 1948.

Administration
Core members of the district's administration are:
Joseph Howe, Superintendent

Board of education
The district's board of education, with nine members, sets policy and oversees the fiscal and educational operation of the district through its administration. As a Type II school district, the board's trustees are elected directly by voters to serve three-year terms of office on a staggered basis, with three seats up for election each year held (since 2012) as part of the November general election.

References

External links
Freehold Borough Schools

School Data for the Freehold Borough Schools, National Center for Education Statistics

Freehold Borough, New Jersey
New Jersey District Factor Group B
School districts in Monmouth County, New Jersey